Euda María Carías Morales (born May 7, 1984) is a female Guatemalan taekwondo athlete.

She won the bronze medal in the women's bantamweight (-53 kg) division at the 2009 World Taekwondo Championships, which was Guatemala's first World Championship medal in taekwondo since 1995 when Heidy Juárez won bronze in women's middleweight.

External links
 The-Sports.org

Further reading
  "Una mujer de combate" (page 4)

1984 births
Living people
Guatemalan female taekwondo practitioners
Taekwondo practitioners at the 2004 Summer Olympics
Taekwondo practitioners at the 2007 Pan American Games
Taekwondo practitioners at the 2011 Pan American Games
Olympic taekwondo practitioners of Guatemala
Pan American Games bronze medalists for Guatemala
Pan American Games medalists in taekwondo
World Taekwondo Championships medalists
European Taekwondo Championships medalists
Medalists at the 2003 Pan American Games
21st-century Guatemalan women